BGC Trust University Bangladesh is a private university in Bangladesh, established in 2001. The university is 34 km from the port city Chittagong at a place popularly known as BGC Biddyanagar by the side of the Chittagong Cox's Bazar Highway Road. The current Vice-Chancellor (VC) of this university is Professor Dr. A.F.M. Aowrangazab.

History 

BGC Trust was founded by Engr. Afsar Uddin Ahmad. BGC Trust University is approved by the Ministry of Education, Government of Bangladesh and University Grants Commission (UGC) of Bangladesh.

Faculties and departments

Students 

BGC Trust University began in 2001 with 500 students. Now it has grown to more than 10,600. There are students from Chittagong, Cox's Bazar, Bandarban, Ranghamati, Khagrachari, Comilla, Dhaka, Rajshahi, Rangpur, Jessore, Mymensingh, Sylhet, Khulna, Barishal etc.

Academic programs 

(Major in Finance, Marketing, Human Resource Management, Management Information System, Accounting, International Business)

List of vice-chancellors 
 Prof. Dr. A.F.M. Aowrangazab ( present ) 
 Prof. Dr. Saroj Kanti Singh Hazari
 Prof. Dr. Md. Nurul Mustafa

Semesters 

The academic year of the BGC Trust University Bangladesh has two semesters. The duration of each semester is six months.
 Spring Session (January - June) 
 Summer Session (July - December)

Grading system 
The Universal Grading System introduced by the University Grant Commission (UGC) of Bangladesh followed by the BGC Trust University Bangladesh. The total numerical marks obtained by a student in each course will be converted into Letter Grade (LG) and Grade Point (GP). According to the Grade Point, the GPA (Grade Point Average) and CGPA (Cumulative Grade Point Average) will be calculated. The conversion of Letter Grade and Grade Point will be as follows:

Clubs
Each department of this university has different clubs. For the students, these clubs regularly conduct different types of curricular and co-curriculum activities and organize various events inside and outside the campus.

Library 
The BGC Trust University library has 50,000 books, a collection of print journals and other publications, and subscriptions to international academic journals. The library location at BGC Biddayanagar Campus.

Health services 
The Medical Center of the BGC Trust University, located near the BGC Trust Medical College and Hospital, offers medical service and pathological examinations to students, teachers, and staffs of the university and also to family members of the teachers and staffs. The center provides service round the clock, seven days a week, with 50 doctors. The center has a dental unit, eye unit, x-ray department and two ambulances. The center has a 500-bed accommodation so that students suffering from contagious diseases like chicken pox, mumps etc. may be taken care of in isolation.

IT facilities 
BGC Biddayanagar is a WiFi campus. The ICT Center of BGCTUB has an Internet bandwidth (uploading and downloading) from 4Mbit/s/4Mbit/s to 30Mbit/s/30Mbit/s. This service is provided by BTCL through direct optical connectivity.

Cafeteria 
There are faculty cafeterias on the campus of BGC Trust University Bangladesh. This place is regarded as the hub of an intellectual center of the University and most famous of them is Bangha Bondhu Freedom square center.

Transport 
BGCTUB has transport services for students. Students can travel to the campus by bus from the City. It takes 50–60 minutes to reach the campus from Chittagong city.

See also
 List of universities in Bangladesh

References

External links
 Official website: https://www.bgctub.ac.bd
 Mirror website: https://www.bgctub-edu.net

Private universities in Bangladesh
Educational institutions established in 2001
2001 establishments in Bangladesh
Education in Bangladesh
Universities and colleges in Chittagong
Education in Chittagong Division
Universities and colleges in Chittagong District